Charlie Wagner's Cafe is a small historic building in the shadow of the Lancaster County Courthouse in Lancaster, Pennsylvania. From 1891 to 1963 the building housed a bar, rather than a cafe, and a few hotel rooms. It has also served as a warehouse for a nearby department store and now houses lawyers' offices.

The building was designed by Lancaster architect C. Emlen Urban. It has three stories designed in the Romanesque Revival style, and surprisingly combines elements of the Queen Anne style. It is constructed of brick with cut-stone and terra cotta elements and pressed metal details. The corner entrance is recessed with a cast-iron column supporting a pair of brick arches. A pyramidal roof also emphasizes the corner, making it appear to be a tower.

It was listed on the National Register of Historic Places in 1983.

References

External links
Master Builders of Lancaster: John Hausladen
Emlen Urban buildings walking tour

Commercial buildings on the National Register of Historic Places in Pennsylvania
Romanesque Revival architecture in Pennsylvania
Commercial buildings completed in 1891
Buildings and structures in Lancaster, Pennsylvania
National Register of Historic Places in Lancaster, Pennsylvania